The Olsen Gang's Big Score is a 1972 Danish comedy film directed by Erik Balling and starring Ove Sprogøe. The film was the fourth in the Olsen-banden-series.

Cast

Ove Sprogøe as Egon Olsen
Morten Grunwald as Benny Frandsen
Poul Bundgaard as Kjeld Jensen
Kirsten Walther as Yvonne Jensen
Arthur Jensen as Kongen
Poul Reichhardt as Knægten
Jesper Langberg as Mortensen
Bjørn Watt-Boolsen as Politichefen
Helle Virkner as Højesteretssagførerens hustru
Asbjørn Andersen as Højesteretssagfører
Jes Holtsø as Børge Jensen
Annika Persson as Sonja
Gotha Andersen as Bademesteren
Gert Bastian as Bankchauffør
Jørgen Beck as Overtjener på hotel
Edward Fleming as Lufthavnsbetjent
Poul Glargaard as Pilot
Poul Gregersen as Bassist
Børge Møller Grimstrup as Værkfører
Tage Grønning as 2. violin
Gunnar Hansen as Kommentator ved fodboldkamp (voice)
Ove Verner Hansen as Købmanden
Knud Hilding as Betjent
Kay Killian as Pianist
Anton Kontra as 1. violin
Bertel Lauring as Tjener på hotel
Ernst Meyer as Bankfunktionær
Jens Okking as Køkkenmester
Søren Rode as Fremmedarbejder
Claus Ryskjær as Ekspedient i tøjforretning
Bjørn Spiro as Bankchauffør
Karl Stegger as Tjener
Søren Strømberg as TV-speaker
Solveig Sundborg as Nabokonen
Bent Thalmay as Bud fra pelsfirma
Poul Thomsen as Pilot
Bent Vejlby as Lufthavnsbetjent
Holger Vistisen as Receptionist på hotel
Bent Warburg as TV-regissør
Henrik Wiehe as Mand i fly

References

External links

1972 films
1972 comedy films
Danish comedy films
1970s Danish-language films
Films directed by Erik Balling
Films with screenplays by Erik Balling
1970s heist films
Olsen-banden films